Football Club Neftchi Kochkor-Ata is a Kyrgyz professional football club based in Kochkor-Ata. Founded in 1952, the club competes in the Kyrgyz Premier League.

History

Domestic

Continental history

Honours
Kyrgyzstan League
Champions (1): 2010.

Kyrgyzstan Cup
Champions (2): 2019, 2021.

Super Cup
Champions (1): 2010.

Current squad

External links
Career stats by KLISF
|sport.kg Profile at sport.kg

Football clubs in Kyrgyzstan
Association football clubs established in 1952
1952 establishments in the Kirghiz Soviet Socialist Republic